The Chattri is a war memorial in the English city of Brighton and Hove. It stands on the site where 53 (37 Hindu and 16 Sikh) Indian soldiers who fought for the British Empire were cremated during the First World War. The structure has Grade II listed status, reflecting its architectural and historic importance. In  2017, as part of the 100th anniversary of World War I, the site of the Chattri was dedicated as a Fields in Trust Centenary Field because of its local heritage and significance.

Indian soldiers in Brighton
India was part of the British Empire during the First World War, and more than 800,000 Indian soldiers fought for the Allied Powers. During the four years of fighting, thousands of wounded combatants were brought to Britain to be treated in makeshift military hospitals. Three were established in Brighton; one was the town's famous royal palace, the Royal Pavilion. King George V is said to have decreed that Indian soldiers were to be treated at the Pavilion, apparently believing that the flamboyant Indo-Saracenic building would provide familiar surroundings. In December 1914, 345 injured soldiers were transported to Brighton by train and were transferred to the hospitals. The King and Queen, Mayor of Brighton, Chief Constable of Brighton and other dignitaries visited frequently, and careful arrangements were made at the Royal Pavilion to provide for the different dietary and other cultural requirements of Hindus, Sikhs and Muslims.

Although the great majority of soldiers recovered from their injuries, some died. The 21 Muslim men who died were taken to the Shah Jahan Mosque in Woking, Surrey, and buried in accordance with Islamic tradition in a new cemetery. The bodies of 53 Hindus and Sikhs were taken to a remote location high on the South Downs above Brighton, where a ghat (funeral pyre) was built so they could be cremated and their ashes scattered in the English Channel. This funeral rite was again carried out in line with religious custom. In total, 18 men who were treated at the Royal Pavilion died, ten of whom were cremated on the ghat. (The 56 other victims died at the Kitchener Hospital—now Brighton General Hospital—or a temporarily converted school at York Place.)

History of the memorial

In August 1915, soon after the last cremations at the ghat site, a lieutenant in the Indian Medical Service and the Mayor of Brighton, Sir John Otter, planned the establishment of a memorial to the soldiers who had died in Brighton. Lt Das Gupta made the proposal, but Otter took on the project almost single-handedly; after leaving his position as Mayor he chaired Brighton's Indian Memorials Committee. In December 1915 he made a proposal to the India Office for a memorial on the ghat site and another in Brighton town centre; Sir Austen Chamberlain, the Secretary of State for India, agreed this in February 1916. In July of that year, the land on which the ghat stood, and the immediate area around it, was transferred from the Marquess of Abergavenny to the ownership of Brighton County Borough. At the same time, the India Office agreed to share the cost of building and erecting the memorial with Brighton Corporation (the forerunner of the present Brighton and Hove City Council), on the understanding that the Corporation would be responsible for the town centre memorial.

Funds were raised during 1917. After delays caused by the need to dedicate all available resources to the war effort, in April 1918 a building firm, KirkPatrick Brothers of Trafford Park near Manchester, was awarded the contract to build the memorial. The main building material was marble; its arrival from Sicily was delayed by more than a year, but building work started in mid-1920.

A young Indian architect E. C. Henriques from Mumbai, who was completing his studies in England designed The Chattri; Sir Samuel Swinton Jacob, an English architect who was responsible for many buildings in India and who helped pioneer the Indo-Saracenic architectural style, provided guidance. Construction work started in August 1920 and continued until the end of that year. Brighton Corporation owned the memorial and took responsibility for its maintenance, and a cottage was provided nearby for a caretaker. This added £1,117 (£ in ) to the final cost of £4,964 (£ in ).

The Chattri was unveiled on 1 February 1921 by Edward, Prince of Wales.

By the mid 1930s, the memorial had fallen into disrepair. The caretaker had died, with nobody replacing him, and the cottage had been demolished. The India Office, which had received many complaints about The Chattri's condition despite the Brighton Corporation having taken full responsibility for its upkeep, liaised with the Corporation and the Imperial War Graves Commission in an attempt to encourage action. Between them, they planned a new maintenance policy and agreed to reduce the amount of surrounding land belonging to the memorial; in 1920 a  area had been created around it. The Second World War intervened, though, and the whole area was hurridly requisitioned by the Army. By the end of the war, The Chattri was covered with bullet holes, having been used as a target by troops practising their rifle shooting. After the war, the War Office agreed to pay in full for repairs, and The Chattri was restored to its original condition. Starting in 1951, the Royal British Legion undertook annual pilgrimages to the memorial, and also contributed to its upkeep. Although these  pilgrimages ceased in 1999, the Sikh community has led a similar annual ceremony every year since 2000.

The Chattri was listed at Grade II by English Heritage on 20 August 1971. It is one of 1,124 Grade II-listed buildings and structures, and 1,218 listed buildings of all grades, in the city of Brighton and Hove.

Architecture and location

The Chattri was built at the exact location where the funeral pyres were constructed for the cremation of the 53 soldiers. The only access to the memorial is from a path off a bridleway between the A27 Brighton Bypass at Patcham and the Clayton Windmills at the top of the Downs. The bridleway, which at that point runs along a ridge between Hogtrough Bottom and Deep Bottom, is part of the Sussex Border Path, and The Chattri is at the northern extremity of the City of Brighton and Hove, on the border with the Mid Sussex district of West Sussex.

White marble from Sicily was used for the body of the memorial. It sits on a plinth of grey stone which stands over three blocks of granite which cover the slabs used during the cremations. The base is square, and the eight columns carrying the dome start with square bases before becoming octagonal halfway up. The base of the dome is then octagonal. The plinth bears an inscription in English, Hindi, Punjabi and Urdu, the text of which was prepared by Sir John Otter:

Gallery

See also
Grade II listed buildings in Brighton and Hove: C–D
Lions of the Great War, another memorial dedicated to Indian Soldiers who fought in the First World War.

Notes

Bibliography

External links

Doctor Brighton's Pavilion

Buildings and structures completed in 1920
World War I memorials in England
Brighton
Grade II listed buildings in Brighton and Hove
Grade II listed monuments and memorials
Monuments and memorials in East Sussex
Military of British India